Anil Firojiya (born 14 July 1971) is an Indian politician serving as the Member of Parliament in the 17th Lok Sabha from Ujjain. He was elected in the 2019 Indian general election as member of the Bharatiya Janata Party. Firojiya was member of the Madhya Pradesh Legislative Assembly from the Tarana constituency in Ujjain district from 2013 to 2018.

Personal life
Firojiya was born on 14 July 1971 to Bhurelal Firojiya and Javetri Firojiya in Ujjain in Madhya Pradesh. He is a Bachelor of Commerce graduate from Government Madhav Arts and Commerce College, Ujjain. Firojiya is married to Sandhya Firojiya, with whom he has two daughters.

Political career
Firojiya was the Madhya Pradesh Legislative Assembly member from the Tarana from 2013 to 2018.

In 2019, he was elected as the Member of Parliament from Ujjain. From 24 July 2019 onwards, he is a member of the Committee on Welfare of the Scheduled Castes and Scheduled Tribes. He is also a member of the Standing Committee on Food, Consumer Affairs and Public Distribution and the Consultative Committee, Ministry of External Affairs since 13 September 2019.

References 

People from Ujjain
Bharatiya Janata Party politicians from Madhya Pradesh
Madhya Pradesh MLAs 2013–2018
Living people
India MPs 2019–present
1971 births